The Men's artistic horizontal bar event took place on 8 October 2010, at the Indira Gandhi Arena.

Final

References
Results

Gymnastics at the 2010 Commonwealth Games